Guion is a given name and surname.

Notable people

Given name 
Guion Bluford (born 1942), American aerospace engineer
Guion Griffis Johnson (1900–1989), American historian

Surname 
Connie Guion (1882–1971), American physician and educator
David Guion (born 1967), French football coach
David W. Guion (1892–1981), American composer
John Isaac Guion (1802–1855), American politician from Mississippi
Letroy Guion (born 1987), American football player
Stephen Barker Guion (1820–1885), American businessman, co-founder of the Williams & Guion Black Star Line
Walter Guion (1849–1927), American politician from Louisiana
William Howe Guion (1817–1890), American businessman, co-founder of the Williams & Guion Black Star Line

See also
Guyon, a variant spelling